Claude Nigon (28 December 1928 – 30 January 1994) was a French fencer. He won a bronze medal in the team épée event at the 1956 Summer Olympics.

References

External links
 

1928 births
1994 deaths
French male épée fencers
Olympic fencers of France
Fencers at the 1952 Summer Olympics
Fencers at the 1956 Summer Olympics
Olympic bronze medalists for France
Olympic medalists in fencing
Medalists at the 1956 Summer Olympics
20th-century French people